The 2007 Black-Eyed Susan Stakes was the 83rd running of the Black-Eyed Susan Stakes. The race took place in Baltimore, Maryland on May 18, 2007, and was televised in the United States on the Bravo TV network owned by NBC. Ridden by jockey Edgar Prado, Panty Raid, won the race by one and one half lengths over runner-up Winning Point. Approximate post time on the evening before the Preakness Stakes was 5:50 p.m. Eastern Time and the race was run for a purse of $250,000. The race was run over a fast track in a final time of 1:50.07. The Maryland Jockey Club reported total attendance of 25,167. The attendance at Pimlico Race Course that day was a record crowd for Black-Eyed Susan Stakes Day.

Payout 

The 83rd Black-Eyed Susan Stakes Payout Schedule

$2 Exacta:  (2–1) paid   $24.00

$2 Trifecta:  (2–1–3) paid   $58.00

$1 Superfecta:  (2–1–3–5) paid   $138.30

The full chart 

 Winning Breeder: Heaven Tree Farm; (KY)  
 Final Time: 1:50.07
 Track Condition: Fast
 Total Attendance: 25,167

See also 
 2007 Preakness Stakes
 Black-Eyed Susan Stakes Stakes "top three finishers" and # of starters

References

External links 
 Official Black-Eyed Susan Stakes website
 Official Preakness website

2007 in horse racing
2007 in American sports
2007 in sports in Maryland
Black-Eyed Susan Stakes
Horse races in Maryland